Brassavola subulifolia is a species of orchid endemic to Jamaica.

References

External links 

IOSPE orchid photos
Ferry, RJ. 2011. MIOS (McAllen International Orchid Society Journal), Vol. 12(2), pp. 9-12, Brassavola subulifolia 
Hamlyn Orchids, Kingston Jamaica, Brassavola

subulifolia
Orchids of Jamaica
Plants described in 1831